This is a list of things named after Bangabandhu Sheikh Mujibur Rahman, founding leader of Bangladesh, the first and fourth President and second Prime Minister of the country (1971–1975). This list includes proposed name changes.

Agencies
 Bangabandhu Aeronautical Centre in Dhaka
 Bangabandhu Hi-Tech City in Gazipur District
 Bangabandhu Sheikh Mujib Industrial City in Chittagong and Feni.
 Bangabandhu Sheikh Mujib International Airport in Madaripur (Proposed)
 Bangabandhu Cantonment in Tangail District

Objects
 Bangabandhu-1, satellite
 BNS Bangabandhu, missile frigate
 Bangabandhu Chair, History Department at the University of Dhaka
 Bangabandhu Chair, at Asian Institute of Technology, Thailand

Buildings and structures
 Bangabandhu Bhaban in Dhaka
 Bangabandhu International Conference Center in Dhaka
 Bangabandhu Bangladesh–China Friendship Exhibition Center
 Bangabandhu Bridge
 Bangabandhu Sheikh Mujibur Rahman Novo Theatre
 Bangabandhu National Stadium in Dhaka
 Bangladesh Air Force Base Bangabandhu, Dhaka
 Bangabandhu Water Treatment Plant in Khulna.
 Bangabandhu Memorial Hospital in Chittagong
 Bangabandhu Square Monument in Dhaka
 Bangabandhu Tower in Dhaka
 Bangabandhu Square in Faridpur
 Bangabandhu Square (Moylapota Mor) in Khulna

Educational institutions

University
 Bangabandhu Sheikh Mujib Medical University in Dhaka
 Bangabandhu Sheikh Mujibur Rahman Agricultural University in Gazipur District
 Bangabandhu Sheikh Mujibur Rahman Science and Technology University in Gopalganj, Bangladesh
Bangabandhu Sheikh Mujibur Rahman Digital University, Gazipur.
 Bangabandhu Sheikh Mujibur Rahman Aviation and Aerospace University, Lalmonirhat
 Bangabandhu Sheikh Mujibur Rahman University, Kishoreganj
Bangabandhu Sheikh Mujibur Rahman Maritime University

Colleges
 Bangabandhu Textile Engineering College in Tangail District
 Government Bangabandhu College in Gopalganj, Bangladesh
 Bangabandhu College in Dhaka
 Bangabandhu College in Khulna
Jatir Janak Bangabandhu Sheikh Mujibur Rahman Govt. College in Dhaka
 Jatir Pita Bangabandhu College in Gazipur District
 Bangabandhu Degree College in Rajshahi District
 Bangabandhu College in Comilla District
 Shimulbari Bangabandhu Degree College in Nilphamari District
 Govt. Mujib College, Companiganj, Noakhali 
 Bangabandhu Govt. College in Badalgachi, Naogaon

Student Hostel 

 Bangabandhu Sheikh Mujibur Rahman Hall in University of Dhaka
 Bangabandhu Sheikh Mujibur Rahman Hall in Chittagong University
 Bangabandhu Sheikh Mujibur Rahman Hall in University of Rajshahi
 Bangabandhu Sheikh Mujibur Rahman Hall in Jahangirnagar University
 Jatir Janak Bango Bandhu Sheikh Mujibur Rahman Hall in Khulna University
 Bangabandhu Sheikh Mujibur Rahman Hall in Begum Rokeya University
 Father of the Nation Bangabandhu Sheikh Mujibur Rahman Hall in Khulna University
 Bangabandhu Shekh Mujibur Rahman Hall in Comilla University
 Bangabandhu Sheikh Mujibur Rahman Hall in Islamic University, Bangladesh in Kushtia
 Bangabandhu Sheikh Mujib Hall in Bangladesh Agricultural University
 Bangabandhu Hall in Chittagong University of Engineering and Technology
 Bangabandhu Sheikh Mujibur Rahman Hall in Mawlana Bhashani Science and Technology University
 Bangabandhu Hall in Khulna University of Engineering and Technology
 Bangabandhu Hall in Shahjalal University of Science & Technology
 Bangabandhu Sheikh Mujibur Rahman Hall in Rajshahi University of Engineering and Technology

Schools
 Syedpur Bangabandhu High School in Narayanganj District
 Bangabandhu Primary School in London
 Ambary Bangabandhu School in Nilphamari District

Transport
 Bangabandhu Hi-Tech City railway station
 Bangabandhu Sheikh Mujibur Rahman Tunnel, underwater expressway tunnel in Chattogram, Bangladesh under the Karnaphuli river.

Streets
 Bangabandhu Avenue in Dhaka
 Sheikh Mujib Road in Chittagong
 Mujib Sharak, Main Road of Faridpur City Faridpur
 Bangabandhu Sheikh Mujibur Rahman Road in Bandarban District
 Sheikh Mujib Way in Chicago
 Bangabandhu Sheikh Mujib Sarani in Kolkata, India
 Bangabandhu Road in Narayanganj District
 Bangabandhu Road in Savar, Dhaka District
 Bangabandhu Sheikh Mujib Road, New Delhi, India
 Bangabandhu Sheikh Mujibur Rahman Boulevard, Ankara, Turkey
 Sheikh Mujibur Rahman Road, Palestine
 Bangabandhu Sheikh Mujib Street, Port Louis, Mauritius

Sports tournament
 Bangabandhu T20 Cup 2020
 Bangabandhu BPL 2020
 Bangabandhu Cup, international football tournament

Topographical features
 Bangabandhu Island
 Bangabandhu Sheikh Mujib Safari Park in Gazipur District
 Bangabandhu Sheikh Mujib Safari Park in Cox's Bazar District
 Bangabandhu Observatory, Bhanga, Faridpur District
 Mujib Park, Faridpur

See also
 Sheikh–Wazed family
 List of things named after Sheikh Hasina
 List of things named after Kazi Nazrul Islam

References

Notes

Citations

Sheikh Mujibur Rahman
Rahman, Sheikh Mujibur
 L